Jaroslav Radoň (born 3 September 1986 in Kutná Hora) is a Czech sprint canoeist. At the 2012 Summer Olympics, he competed in the Men's C-2 1000 metres, together with Filip Dvořák, finishing 5th.

References

1986 births
Living people
Czech male canoeists
Olympic canoeists of the Czech Republic
Canoeists at the 2012 Summer Olympics
Canoeists at the 2016 Summer Olympics
People from Kutná Hora
Canoeists at the 2015 European Games
European Games competitors for the Czech Republic
Universiade medalists in canoeing
Universiade silver medalists for the Czech Republic
Medalists at the 2013 Summer Universiade
Sportspeople from the Central Bohemian Region